Mao Tianyi (born ) is a Chinese male volleyball player. He is part of the China men's national volleyball team. On club level he plays for Army.

References

External links
 profile at FIVB.org

1993 births
Living people
Chinese men's volleyball players
Volleyball players at the 2014 Asian Games
Asian Games competitors for China
21st-century Chinese people